A Valid Path is the fourth solo album by English rock musician Alan Parsons. The record was released on 24 August 2004 via Artemis label.

Background
The gap between this and his previous album, The Time Machine, was the third greatest period between two consecutive albums, after the time between the split of The Alan Parsons Project and Parsons' first solo work (not counting Freudiana) and the time between this album and The Secret. In addition to contributors such as David Gilmour, another noteworthy musical credit on the album is Parsons' son, Jeremy Parsons, his debut appearance on his father's albums.

A Valid Path was released on Audio CD and DualDisc, with the DualDisc containing the album recorded in 5.1 Surround in both DTS and Dolby Digital formats. Other features of the DualDisc include a track commentary by the artist and interviews with Alan Parsons and the main collaborators on the release including David Gilmour and The Crystal Method.

Track listing
"Return to Tunguska" – (Alan Parsons, Simon Posford) Instrumental, featuring Shpongle & David Gilmour – 8:48
"More Lost Without You" – (Parsons, Olsson) Lead Vocal P.J. Olsson – 3:20
"Mammagamma 04" – (Parsons, Eric Woolfson) Instrumental; remix of "Mammagamma", featuring Jeremy Parsons – 5:06
"We Play the Game" – (Parsons, Ken Jordan, Scott Kirkland) Lead Vocal Alan Parsons, featuring The Crystal Method – 5:33
"Tijuaniac" – (Parsons, Mogt, Ruiz, Mendoza, Amezcua, Beas) Instrumental featuring Nortec Collective – 5:21
"L'Arc En Ciel" dedicated to Anson Grossfeld 1957–2004 – (Parsons, Wiles) Instrumental featuring Überzone – 5:26
"A Recurring Dream Within a Dream" a composite of "A Dream Within a Dream" & "The Raven" – (both compositions by Parsons, Woolfson) Lead Vocal Alan Parsons featuring Jeremy Parsons and narration by Orson Welles – 4:06
"You Can Run" – (Parsons, Pack) Lead Vocal David Pack featuring Deep E – 3:51
"Chomolungma" – (Parsons, Parsons, Olsson) Instrumental featuring Jeremy Parsons & P.J. Olsson with added concluding narration by John Cleese – 6:35

Personnel
 Alan Parsons – vocals, processed vocals, guitar, slide guitar, bass guitar, keyboards, vocoder
 Scott Kirkland – keyboards, programming 
 Simon Posford – programming, sequencer
 Ken Jordan – programming, sequencer
 Jeremy Parsons – guitar, programming, sequencer 
 David Pack – guitar, keyboards, vocals
 David Gilmour – guitar on "Return to Tunguska"
 Alastair Greene – guitar
 P. J. Olsson – vocals, programming
 Michele Adamson, Lisa Parsons – vocals
 John Cleese – narration on "Chomolungma"
 Orson Welles – narration on "A Recurring Dream Within a Dream"

Charts

References

Alan Parsons albums
2004 albums
Albums produced by Alan Parsons
Artemis Records albums